BS 857:1967 is a currently in-use British Standard specification for flat or curved safety glasses (toughened  or laminated) for use in land vehicles, including road vehicles and railway vehicles. The standard specifies the mechanical, safety, impact and optical requirements as well as sampling and test methods.

Other vehicle safety glass standards
UNECE Reg. 43 is an UNECE standard for safety glass used in road vehicles.

References

Glass engineering and science
Vehicle safety technologies
Car windows
00857